Nikolay Mikhaylovich Rubtsov (3 January 1936, Yemetsk, Northern Krai19 January 1971, Vologda) was a Russian poet.

Rubtsov was killed on the night of 19 January 1971, at the age of 35, in his apartment, the result of a domestic dispute with an aspiring poet Lyudmyla Derbina. The judicial investigation established that the death was violent, occurred as a result of suffocationmechanical asphyxia from squeezing the neck with her hands.

Asteroid 4286 Rubtsov was named after him.

References

External links

 Nikolay Rubtsov poetry at Stihipoeta
 Nikolay Rubtsov's Poems
 , song by Larisa Novoseltseva on poem by Rubtsov

Soviet male poets
Russian male poets
1936 births
1971 deaths
20th-century Russian poets
20th-century Russian male writers
People murdered in the Soviet Union
Deaths from asphyxiation
Russian-language poets
Maxim Gorky Literature Institute alumni